Jazz is my Native Language: A Portrait of Toshiko Akiyoshi is a 1983 documentary film by Renee Cho about the jazz pianist, composer, arranger and big band leader Toshiko Akiyoshi.

References
Ing, Sarah.  Synopsis.  
Jazz Is My Native Language (1983/84) review, 2011 February 8.

External links 
Jazz is My Native Language: A Portrait of Toshiko Akiyoshi at Center for Asian American Media
Jazz is My Native Language... at University of California, Berkeley Library 
Jazz is My Native Language... at Temple University Television

American documentary films
Documentary films about jazz music and musicians
1983 films
1983 documentary films
1980s English-language films
1980s American films